The 1938–39 Duke Blue Devils men's basketball team represented Duke University during the 1938–39 men's college basketball season. The head coach was Eddie Cameron, coaching his 11th season with the Blue Devils. The team finished with an overall record of 10–12.

References 

Duke Blue Devils men's basketball seasons
Duke
1938 in sports in North Carolina
1939 in sports in North Carolina